Kaviria is a genus of flowering plants belonging to the family Amaranthaceae.

Its native range is Somalia to Arabian Peninsula, Syria to Central Asia and Pakistan.

Species:

Kaviria aucheri 
Kaviria azaurena 
Kaviria gossypina 
Kaviria lachnantha 
Kaviria pycnophylla 
Kaviria rubescens 
Kaviria tomentosa 
Kaviria vvedenskyi 
Kaviria zehzadii

References

Amaranthaceae
Amaranthaceae genera